Gorgdan (also Romanized as Gorgdān) is a village in Kuhmareh Rural District, Kuhmareh District, Kazerun County, Fars Province, Iran. At the 2006 census, its population was 662, in 162 families.

References 

Populated places in Kazerun County